The Avibras Falcão is a Brazilian unmanned aerial vehicle (UAV) designed for reconnaissance missions, target acquisition, support for firing direction, damage assessment, and land and maritime surveillance. Its design is the result of the work of several engineers, technicians and designers led by Eng. Alessandro L. Branco, Technical Manager to UAV and Aeronautical Systems at Avibras.

References

Unmanned military aircraft of Brazil
2010s Brazilian military reconnaissance aircraft
2010s Brazilian military aircraft
Medium-altitude long-endurance unmanned aerial vehicles